Frederick Gordon "Fred" Hill (born August 13, 1943) is a former professional American football player.

College career
Hill played college football at the University of Southern California.

Professional career
He was drafted by the Baltimore Colts in the 1965 NFL Draft but was soon traded to the Philadelphia Eagles, with whom he played at tight end from 1965 through 1971.

Personal life

In 1971, his five-year-old daughter Kim (August 11, 1966 – March 5, 2011) was diagnosed with leukemia. His teammates, general manager Jim Murray, and team owner Leonard Tose rallied around the family. In the aftermath of her successful treatment, the team in 1972 initiated the Eagles Fly for Leukemia philanthropic program, and Hill, Murray, and teammates co-founded the very first Ronald McDonald House, which opened in Philadelphia in 1974. Kim Hill died in 2011.

The Eagles had a tie-in with McDonald's Shamrock Shake. By donating a share of every shake sold to the Eagles Fly for Leukemia, McDonald's acquired naming rights.

At one home game each season, the Eagles pass a bucket in the stands for donations to the Eagles Fly for Leukemia charity.

Hill owns several McDonald's franchises in south Orange County, California.

References

1943 births
Living people
American football tight ends
Baltimore Colts players
Players of American football from Los Angeles
Philadelphia Eagles players
USC Trojans football players
USC Trojans baseball players